Edgar Smith (born August 8, 1973) is a Dominican author born in Villa Consuelo, in the capital city of Santo Domingo, who lives in the United States since 2010. He is the eldest child of Juana I. Fernández and Ramón Smith, a member of the International Taekwon-Do Federation Hall of Fame. He is a writer, editor and translator, who runs an independent publishing business, Books & Smith, in New York City, where he resided for over a decade until 2021 when he relocated with his family to Texas.

Smith has published fifteen books in the genres of Fiction, Short fiction and Poetry, both in English and Spanish. Two of his books, the short fiction collection Through This Strange Window and the Spanish autobiographic poetry collection La Noventa have been #1 Amazon Bestsellers. Edgar is recognized as an influential Literary voice in what is known as La Diáspora—the conglomerate of Dominican writers who migrated to the USA.

Background
Edgar is the oldest of five siblings: Joan Smith and Arlette Alvarez, sisters from his mother's side, and Jennepher and Enmanuel Smith from his father's. He was born and raised in Villa Consuelo, a typically poor neighborhood in Santo Domingo. His family was catholic but not entirely devout. Edgar had a rather happy childhood, despite the absence of his father, who migrated to the United States when Edgar was three years old. The two would see each other again roughly three or four times in a lapse of at least eighteen years.

His grandfather, Carlos Ignacio Fernández Sánchez, AKA El Curro, became the father figure in Edgar's life. Regarded as an honest and kind man who liked women and enjoyed traveling, he is the great grandson of Francisco del Rosario Sánchez, one of the Founding Fathers of the Dominican Republic. Edgar's nickname for him was Abu, short for abuelo (grandfather). El Curro was Edgar's first role model. Juana, his mother, was another influential person in the poet's journey. Light-spirited and social, she enjoyed reading and, although dropped out, did attend college until she was pregnant with Edgar—to El Curro's disappointment. She owned a set of the Illustrated Cumbre Encyclopedia, which for many years was Edgar's source for cultural research, homework, and intellectual disputes with his friends.

Despite the general sense of joy and stability at home, the absence of his father affected Edgar's self-confidence as a kid. His mother and grandpa were over-protective, aware that the streets of Villa Consuelo brimmed with drug dealers, thieves, knife-fighters and women of ill repute, which led to limited street playtime and close supervision of his friends and whereabouts. It is common to find references in Edgar's writings about instances of loneliness during his childhood and early teenagerhood. Recurring themes are his fear of flying kites like the other children (who would climb up on rooftops and balconies), and his creation of paper heroes and monsters at the top of the wooden stairs on the second floor of la noventa (#90), as his house was known to everyone back then. Coming from one of the better-off families on his street, la Baltasara de los Reyes, as a result of his grandfather's Motorcycle Spare Parts shop, Edgar was able to attend private schools throughout his elementary and high school periods. He was a good elementary school student, but his grades suffered in high school.

One of the very first schools Edgar attended was el Maternal Alpa. It was a sort of pre-school or Kindergarten. His childhood best friend was Yuri García. Yu or Bomba, as Edgar called him, was a kind, smart and humble kid whose mother, Patria, owned a beauty salon a block-and-a-half from Edgar's house. The Garcías, however, belonged to the Middle class (the division of Social classes is markedly clear in the Dominican Republic)and lived in a nice neighborhood called Invi. Despite their statuses, their moms were acquaintances and they were inseparable friends. Whenever it was possible, Edgar would spend weekends in el Invi and, three or four times, was allowed to travel with Yuri's family to los Guayacanes (a beach area in a town of the same name) for Easter time. These are some of Edgar's fondest memories as a child and growing teenager. Yuri and his family (even constantly-serious-looking Juan García, Yuri's father) felt like a second family to the author.

Edgar graduated from high school in 1992 from Santo Cura de Ars school (CESCAR). He went on to study Marketing at the Universidad Autónoma de Santo Domingo (UASD), but dropped out after barely two semesters.

Early Literature Inspiration
Smith's earliest encounters with the written word were from Comic books and Pulp-Westerns. He was an avid reader of Marcial LaFuente: Estefanía and Rurales de Texas, as well as the Kaliman, Fantomas, Memin, and Samurai Comic books—these were all Spanish Comic books that circulated regularly in Santo Domingo.  He was particularly fond of the description of fight scenes and gun duels in the pulp-Westerns and the detailed physiques of good and bad guys, as well as the way the writers knew how to keep building tension throughout each story. These were the first signs that he was into reading not only for the stories themselves, but also because he was in awe of the writing: of the ability to create such new worlds.

Smith also liked (and eventually collected)classical North-American Superhero Comics. His favorite characters are Superman, The Hulk, Batman, Daredevil, Gladiator, and Wolverine. Although he was a romantic at heart, who liked to improvise rhymed poems for girls, relatives and friends, he was better known among them for his inclinations to story-telling. He would spend long minutes improvising fantastic stories in the living room, where his sisters and closest friends would gather for la chercha (the get-together), to fool around and to hear Edgar narrate what he said were dreams, but everyone knew were not.

Aside from the mandatory readings in high school (La mañosa, Juan Salvador Gaviota, La Cándida Heréndira…) Edgar's attention to books was very brief and narrow. His artistic focus had switched to movies and drawing: he was a decently talented illustrator. He sketched well and often. He attended the Santo Cura de Ars School(CESCAR) for most of his academic life and his friends remember him mostly as an illustrator with a big imagination. As a curious note, years later, and as the result of one of his lifelong friends' connections, Moises Martínez, Edgar published what is arguably the first ever Dominican Comic strip in a newspaper (His friend worked for the newspaper El Siglo). It was an unprofessional, one-page work, but it was published nonetheless on the children session for at least two or three weeks. The name of the character was Peviak: el pacificador (the peacemaker). His suit had the colors of the Dominican flag and he wore a mask similar to that of Daredevil's. Peviak was a tribute to Edgar's self-coined nickname: El Pevi (a self-alluding grandiose acronym: Específicamente La Parte Esencial de (la) Vida (y el) Intelecto [it translates as 'Specifically the Essential part of life and intellect]), which he made up when he was an avid street checkers player. Later in life, the author would often say, "there are two things I really learned in this life: English and Checkers."

English as Second Language and Edgar Rice Boroughs

In 1988, Edgar attended the Learning Center Institute, a private technical school focused on English as a second language. There he met many influential people in his life, including mentors Ángel Hernández and Ángel González—both of whom he called 'Daddy' (he saw them both as father figures); his first platonic love Swuamny Cedano Morales; and Carolina Recio, his first wife and mother of two of his three children: Swamny Smith and Jan Edgar Smith. He became good friends with several of his English teachers despite their difference in age, such as Livio Herrera, Loiky Mariñez, and secretary Gloria Herrera; and with many of his students. One, particularly, was very close to him for years: Juan Taylor Ventura. He was an architect and politician, very much fond of Edgar's intelligence. John Taylor, as Edgar called him, had a remarkable sense of humor, great empathy and such personality and wisdom that inspired the young writer in many ways.

Edgar demonstrated great aptitude for the language. He was fluent in no time and, as was the norm in the school with outstanding students, was offered work as a teacher soon after graduation. This contact with the Learning Center and its owner, Mr. Hernández, was instrumental in the development of Edgar's character, ambitions, goals, and views on life. English would prove to be the key to most of the doors to come his way. One of these doors was Literature.

Michael Jiménez, another of Edgar's friends from la Baltasara St., who shared his enthusiasm for English, books and words in general, took him to the Helen Keller library in Santo Domingo. This library was full with English books. Edgar had already had contact with English literature, mostly source material for films, but it was there, at Helen Keller's, that he discovered his first literary infatuations: his namesake Edgar Rice Boroughs and Walt Whitman. He also fell in love with the old English of the King James Bible, but it was the adventures of John Carter, Warlord of Mars, that truly engaged the young author. In many ways, John Carter and his incredible journeys(Borough's style, truly) reminded him of the Pulp-Western novelettes he used to read when younger. The broader scope of these works, however, the much greater imagination involved, the vocabulary (both challenging and enticing) turned young Smith into an instant fan. Just as surely, only more slowly, he fell in love with Leaves of Grass, until it became a book of cult to him. Whitman's free verse (he had read free verse before, in Spanish, but nothing like this) was a liberation to the young aspiring writer. It could be said that, out of the discovery of both Boroughs and Whitman (and then moving on to Frank Herbert, Betty Smith, Sidney Sheldon and Tom Clancy, all of whom were also discovered at the library) Edgar's pursuit of writing took a second, more serious swing.

On March 15, 1995, at the age of twenty-one, Edgar landed a job with American Airlines—recommended by his cousin Julio Camarena—as an Airline Security Agent. His first daughter, Swamny Smith, had been born almost a month before, on February 19. Edgar worked for AA for thirteen years—until August 8, 2008, the day of his 34th birthday. He has always described his tenure at the airport as "the best years of my life." American brought Edgar many opportunities, ranging from professional development (he was promoted three times: Acting Lead, Lead Agent and Ground Security Coordinator), a wider spectrum of friends, deeper insight on social differences, to, most importantly, travel abroad for the first time to have the chance to meet his father again after, roughly, a decade. The AA years also provided the perfect ambience to develop his reading hunger—never before or after did the young poet read as avidly and as often. He devoured every book that got into his hands, Spanish or English, thriller, romance or spy story, good or bad, famous or novice. It was common to see him walk from one position to the next with a book tucked under his arm. They called him 'el poeta Makumbero'--he had a dual and contradictory reputation as a poet and discotheque fanatic (especially a club called Makumba.) In this period, Edgar read everything he could from James Patterson, Paulo Coelho, Bram Stocker, Khaled Hosseini, Victor Hugo, Gustave Flaubert, Carlos Cuauhtémoc Sánchez, Tom Clancy, Graham Greene, Sidney Sheldon, Rainier María Rilke, Pablo Neruda, Mary Higgins Clarke, Michael Connelly, John Grisham, and Robert Ludlum, among many more. Of all the writers that enthralled him, no others were as influential and determining in his style as Jorge Luis Borges, Pablo Neruda, Anne Rice, Ayn Rand and Stan Rice.

Publications

In 2013, after a lengthy interaction on several online literary websites and Facebook groups, motivated mostly by fellow poet and online friend Jennifer Moore, Edgar published two books, El Palabrador (Short Fiction) and Algunas Tiernas Imprecisiones (Poetry), both in his native language: Spanish. These publications opened the doors to the Hispanic/Latina Book Fair of New York, presided by Dominican poet Dr. Juan Nicolas Tineo—one of many emblematic writers of La Diaspora. Soon, Smith found himself roaming the streets of Manhattan to attend dozens of Literary events, both as participant and supporter. Many of these events were hosted by poet and Cultural activist Gladys Montolio, founder of Lacuhe, a Cultural non-profit. He was invited, later that year, to participate in the Providence Book Fair, where he read alongside some important writers of the Dominican Diaspora, such as Eduardo Lantigua, Kianny N. Antigua, Felix Garcia, Rossalinna Benjamin, Yolanda Hernandez, Cesar Sanchez Beras and Osiris Mosquea.

Books

Poetry
 
 
 
 
 
 

Short story books
 
 
 
 

Novels

References

External links

1973 births
Living people
21st-century Dominican Republic poets
Dominican Republic male poets